Mothern may refer to:
 Mothern, Bas-Rhin, a commune in the Bas-Rhin department of north-eastern France
 Mothern (TV series), a Brazilian comedy television series